Laura Monyeazo Abebe (born 29 July 1989), popularly known as Moet Abebe, is a Nigerian video jockey, television presenter, actress, catering exec. Her journey into limelight came after she decided to move back to Nigeria in pursuit of a career as a TV presenter. Three months after moving back to Lagos, Nigeria, she attended  an audition for Soundcity TV, she sailed through the auditions and started working for Soundcity TV as a TV presenter and producer. She became a very popular face on Soundcity TV as a host of the One On One show, Body & Soul and Global Countdown show. While working at Soundcity she had the opportunity of getting a few movie and TV series scripts such as Red Card, Oasis and Living Arrangement.
In 2016, she began her career on Soundcity Radio 98.5fm where she handles the afternoon popular show called “The Takeover” from 2-6pm Monday to Friday. 
She opened her event management and catering company with her mother called LM Occasions.

Early life
Born in the United Kingdom, she went to Corona Ikoyi Primary School for her primary school education, Dowen College for a year where she did part of her secondary education. From there she went to Woldingham School and St. Teresa's Secondary School also in Surrey where she then did her GCSEs and A-Levels. In 2008 she gained admission into the University of Manchester, where she studied Law  While she was in secondary school she had great interests in a lot of extracurricular activities such as public speaking, acting, athletics and dance which increased and developed her sense of creativity which would be of great advantage to her later in life.

Career

TV and radio presenter
Abebe joined Soundcity TV, an urban music television channel, where gained a following. She has featured top Nigeria musicians on her radio show such as Vector (rapper), 2Baba, Olamide, Chidinma and D'banj.

Actress
Abebe showed her versatility in entertainment when she acted in a few movies and TV series which include  Red Card, Oasis and Living Arrangement. her acting has given her an edge in the Nigeria entertainment and media industry.

Events and red carpets
Abebe has graced many red carpet events, some as a guest and others as the host of the red carpet, she has been awarded by Meets media. as "Personality of the Month" and has been nominated for several awards such as TV presenter of the year" by Exquuisite Magazine and many more.

References

External links
 

1989 births
Living people
Nigerian television personalities
Alumni of the University of Manchester
Yoruba women television personalities
 British emigrants to Nigeria